The Essential Clash is a career-spanning greatest hits album by The Clash first released in 2003. It is part of the ongoing 'The Essential' Sony BMG compilation series. The album is dedicated to Joe Strummer, who died during its compilation.

The "This Is Radio Clash" track
The B-side recording "Radio Clash" was released on the US version of this album with the incorrect A-side title of "This Is Radio Clash". The B-side is a remix of the A-side with additional lyrics. Both tracks have the same length.

Reception

Spin (6/03, p. 104) – "These two discs are a pretty hot crib sheet....The first 11 cuts are a shuffle mix of highlights from the U.S. and U.K. versions of 1977's incendiary The Clash, and if they don't inspire you to punch holes in the plaster, you're too well-adjusted."
Uncut (5/03, p. 114) – 4 stars out of 5 – "They never lost sight of Britain's strange mix of supermarket torpor and multicultural high energy."
Charlotte Robinson on Popmatters says that: Given its breadth, however, The Essential Clash will probably be the preferred collection of most listeners.

Track listing

Disc one
All songs written by Joe Strummer and Mick Jones, except where noted.
"White Riot" – 1:59
"London's Burning" – 2:10
"Complete Control" – 3:13
"Clash City Rockers" (original version) – 3:56
"I'm So Bored with the U.S.A." – 2:25
"Career Opportunities" – 1:52
"Hate & War" – 2:05
"Cheat" – 2:06
"Police & Thieves" – 6:00 (Junior Murvin, Lee "Scratch" Perry)
"Janie Jones" – 2:05
"Garageland" – 3:13
"Capital Radio One" – 2:09
"(White Man) In Hammersmith Palais" – 4:01
"English Civil War" – 2:36 (traditional, arranged by Jones and Strummer)
"Tommy Gun" – 3:17
"Safe European Home" – 3:51
"Julie's Been Working for the Drug Squad" – 3:04 (uncredited Piano by Allen Lanier) 
"Stay Free" – 3:40
"Groovy Times" – 3:30
"I Fought the Law" – 2:39 (Sonny Curtis)

UK version adds "1977" – 1:41 as track 2.

Disc two
All tracks written by The Clash, except where noted.
"London Calling" – 3:20 (Jones, Strummer)
"The Guns of Brixton" – 3:10 (Paul Simonon)
"Clampdown" – 3:50 (Jones, Strummer)
"Rudie Can't Fail" – 3:29 (Jones, Strummer)
"Lost in the Supermarket" – 3:47 (Jones, Strummer)
"Jimmy Jazz" – 3:55 (Jones, Strummer)
"Train in Vain (Stand by Me)" – 3:11 (Jones, Strummer)
"Bankrobber" – 4:35 (Jones, Strummer)
"The Magnificent Seven" – 5:33
"Ivan Meets G.I. Joe" – 3:07
"Police on My Back" – 3:17 (Eddy Grant) (UK release replaces this recording with "Broadway" – 4:56, between "The Street Parade" and "This is Radio Clash")
"Stop the World" – 2:33
"Somebody Got Murdered" – 3:34
"The Street Parade" – 3:29
"This Is Radio Clash" (on US release this recording is the B-side "Radio Clash (remix)", not the A-side "This Is Radio Clash") – 4:10
"Ghetto Defendant" – 4:44
"Rock the Casbah" – 3:42
"Straight to Hell" – 5:30
"Should I Stay or Should I Go" – 3:08
"This Is England" – 3:50 (Bernard Rhodes, Strummer)

DVD

Track listing
 Clash on Broadway Trailer including "London Calling" and "Radio Clash"
 "White Riot"
 "Complete Control"
 "Tommy Gun"
 "Clampdown"
 "Train in Vain"
 "London Calling"
 "Bankrobber"
 "The Call Up"
 "Rock the Casbah"
 "Should I Stay or Should I Go?" (live)
 "Career Opportunities" (live)

Special features
 Hell W10 – written and directed by Joe Strummer.  Filmed in black and white during the winter of early 1983.
 Promo Footage (1976) – including "1977", "White Riot" and "London's Burning"
 Discography
 "I Fought the Law" (Live, from the film Rude Boy)
 Interview clip (London Weekend Show 1976)

Credits
 All videos directed by Don Letts except "Tommy Gun" directed by Keef & Co and "White Riot" directed by Lindsey Clinell.
 Hell W10 soundtrack features excerpts from; "Version City", "Rudie Can't Fail", "First Night Back in London (Instrumental)", "Know Your Rights (Instrumental)", "Long Time Jerk (Instrumental)", "Cool Confusion (Instrumental)", "Ghetto Defendant (Instrumental)", "Junco Version (Instrumental)", "Atom Tam (Instrumental)", "Silicone on Sapphire", "Wrong 'Em Boyo", "Overpowered by Funk (Instrumental)", "The Call Up", "Red Angel Dragnet (Instrumental)", "Jimmy Jazz", "Mensforth Hill", "Junkie Slip", "Time Is Tight", "Armagideon Time", "Listen", "The Equaliser", "Police on My Back", "One More Dub", "Rock the Casbah (Instrumental)".

Charts

References 

2003 greatest hits albums
2003 video albums
Albums produced by Bill Price (record producer)
The Clash compilation albums
Music video compilation albums
Epic Records compilation albums
Epic Records video albums